Caroline Susan Hill  (born 21 October 1961) is a group leader and head of the Developmental Signalling Laboratory at the Francis Crick Institute.

Education
Hill was educated at North London Collegiate School and graduated from the University of Cambridge with a first in Natural Sciences in 1984. She was an undergraduate at Trinity Hall, Cambridge and then did postgraduate research at Murray Edwards College, Cambridge, then known as New Hall, and was awarded a PhD in 1989 for research supervised by Jean Thomas.

Career and research
Hill moved to the Cancer Research UK (CRUK) London Research Institute (now part of the Francis Crick Institute) in 1998, to head up the Developmental Signalling Laboratory. In November 2016, she was interviewed on the BBC World Service, along with the Crick's chief executive Paul Nurse about the future of biomedical research.

Awards and honours
Hill was elected a member of the European Molecular Biology Organization (EMBO) in 2002 and a Member of the Academia Europaea in 2013. In 2015, she was elected a Fellow of the European Academy of Cancer Sciences. In 2019, she was elected a Fellow of the Academy of Medical Sciences.

References

Alumni of Trinity Hall, Cambridge
Members of the European Molecular Biology Organization
People educated at North London Collegiate School
1961 births
Living people
Academics of the Francis Crick Institute